Tony: Another Double Game, also known as Tony: The Other Side of Violent Turin (in original Italian, Tony, l'altra faccia della Torino violenta ), is a 1980 poliziotteschi film. This film by Carlo Ausino is a sequel to Double Game.

Synopsis
Sequel in-name alone to Double Game has a good-hearted drifter named Tony (Emanuel Cannarsa) get targeted by a vicious gang when he attempts to stop a kidnapping. He must turn to his friend on the police force Santini (Giuseppe Alotta) and use his wits to stay alive.

Last Print
According to NoShame films (distributor of the DVD) all the original elements for this movie no longer exist. The 35mm print used for the NoShame DVD release is from director Carlo Ausino's private collection and is believed to be the last print in existence.

Releases
Director Carlo Ausino provided his own personal print for NoShame films to release on DVD. Due to the damage to the print NoShame released the film as a bonus on their release for the first film Double Game.

References

External links

1980 films
1980s Italian-language films
1980s crime action films
1980s crime thriller films
1980 action thriller films
Italian sequel films
Italian crime action films
Poliziotteschi films
Films set in Turin
Films scored by Stelvio Cipriani
1980s Italian films